The 1980 Texas Tech Red Raiders football team represented Texas Tech University as a member of the Southwest Conference (SWC) during the 1980 NCAA Division I-A football season. In their third and final season under head coach Rex Dockery, the Red Raiders compiled a 5–6 record (3–5 against SWC opponents), were outscored by a combined total of 188 to 178, and finished in a tie for sixth place in the conference.  The team played its home games at Clifford B. and Audrey Jones Stadium in Lubbock, Texas.

Schedule

Roster

References

Texas Tech
Texas Tech Red Raiders football seasons
Texas Tech Red Raiders football